Marina Fernandez (born 19 June 1981) is a Croatian actress.

Biography
Marina was born in Split, Croatia. She went to university until 2000 in Split where she finished business school as a department sales managers.

Filmography
 Ruža vjetrova as Marija Matic-Mrcela (2012–2013)

References

External links

1981 births
Living people
Actors from Split, Croatia
Croatian actresses
Croatian expatriates in Portugal